Darzi Mahalleh (also Romanized as Darzī Maḩalleh) is a village in Mehravan Rural District, in the Central District of Neka County, Mazandaran Province, Iran. At the 2006 census, its population was 250, in 65 families.

References 

Populated places in Neka County